Connelly School of the Holy Child is a Catholic, independent, college-preparatory school for girls, grades 6-12 located in Potomac, Maryland. It is operated independently in the Archdiocese of Washington, and is a member of the Association of Independent Schools of Greater Washington and the Association of Independent Maryland Schools.

History
Connelly School of the Holy Child, established by the Society of the Holy Child Jesus in Potomac in 1961, is a Catholic, independent, for girls, grades 6-12. The school is part of a network of Holy Child schools, with a curriculum based on the educational and moral teachings of Cornelia Connelly.

Curriculum
Upper School graduation requirements include 4 English credits, 4 Religion credits, 4 Mathematics credits, 3 Science credits, 3 Social Studies credits, 3 Foreign Language credits, 2 Fine Arts credits, and 1.5 Physical Education credits. The school also offers AP courses.

Athletics
Holy Child participates in the Independent School League.
Seasonal sports offered at Holy Child include soccer, field hockey, volleyball, cross country, and tennis in the fall; swimming, basketball, and indoor lacrosse in winter; lacrosse, softball, track, golf, and tennis in spring; and equestrian and dance in all seasons.

References

External links
 

Independent School League
Catholic secondary schools in Maryland
Educational institutions established in 1961
Girls' schools in Maryland
Society of the Holy Child Jesus
Private middle schools in Montgomery County, Maryland
Private high schools in Montgomery County, Maryland
1961 establishments in Maryland
Schools in Potomac, Maryland